is a Japanese footballer currently playing as a midfielder for Tokyo Verdy.

Career statistics

Club
.

Notes

References

External links

 Player profile from Tokyo Verdy website

2001 births
Living people
Japanese footballers
Japan youth international footballers
Association football midfielders
J2 League players
Tokyo Verdy players
SC Sagamihara players